Storm King Dam is a reservoir created by the dam of the same name in the locality of Storm King in the Southern Downs Region, Queensland, Australia. It provides water for the town of Stanthorpe.

Geography 
Storm King Dam was created from Quart Pot Creek which is the only inflow and outflow of the dam.

History 
The dam takes its name from the Storm King Mining Company which was established by John Yaldwyn and James Ross, who built an earlier dam for mining purposes. The company, in turn, took its name from the sailing ship Storm King, on which they migrated to Australia, arriving 9 February 1872.

The present dam was first proposed in 1928 but was not built until 1954 by the Stanthorpe Shire Council. It had filled by February 1954. Following local government area amalgamations in 2008, the dam is currently operated by the Southern Downs Regional Council. It supplies water both to residents of Stanthorpe and to irrigators.

In the 1980s, the Memorial School of Arts was relocated from Amiens to the dam to expand the recreation centre in the youth camp. It opened in Amiens in 1926.

During drought periods, the dam has proved inadequate to meet the needs of the community it serves. In 2007, Storm King Dam was carrying as little as two months supply. In August 2019, the dam was almost dry and plans were being made to bring drinking water to the community by truck. The shire council delivered water by truck from approximately January 2020 to March 2021. Following heavy rain on the eastern seaboard in mid-late March 2021, the dam filled and started to spill.

Amenities
Storm King Dam is available for recreational use, including fishing, water sports, bird watching and picnics. Fish in the dam include Murray cod, yellowbelly and silver perch. The lake attracts many water birds including pelicans. Barbeques and other picnic facilities are available. Boating is permitted on the lake, but motor boats require a permit.

There is a boat ramp and jetty off Eukey Road. It is managed by the Southern Downs Regional Council.

References

External links

Southern Downs Region
Dams in Queensland